Velečín is a municipality and village in Plzeň-North District in the Plzeň Region of the Czech Republic. It has about 80 inhabitants.

Administrative parts
The village of Ostrovec is an administrative part of Velečín.

References

Villages in Plzeň-North District